The 1956 United States Senate election in Kentucky took place on November 6, 1956. Incumbent Democratic Senator Earle Clements was defeated for re-election by Republican nominee Thruston B. Morton.

Primary elections
Primary elections were held on May 29, 1956.

Democratic primary

Candidates
Earle Clements, incumbent U.S. Senator
Joe B. Bates, former U.S. Representative
Rev. James L. Delk, unsuccessful candidate for Democratic nomination for U.S. Senate in 1946 and 1950

Results

Republican primary

Candidates
Julian H. Golden, former State Senator, former attorney for the National Park Service
Thruston B. Morton, former U.S. Representative, former Assistant Secretary of State for Legislative Affairs
Granville P. Thomas, unsuccessful candidate for Democratic nomination for Kentucky's 8th congressional district in 1954

Results

General election

Results

See also 
 1956 United States Senate elections

References

Bibliography
 
 

1956
Kentucky
United States Senate